Vershinin or Vershynin is a Russian masculine surname, its feminine counterpart is Vershinina. Notable people with the surname include:

Aleksei Vershinin (born 1979), Russian footballer
Konstantin Vershinin (1900–1973), Soviet Air Force marshal
Viktor Vershinin (1928–1989), Soviet Olympic cyclist
Viktoriya Vershynina (born 1971), Ukrainian long jumper

Russian-language surnames